This is a list of the tallest buildings in Spain. In recent years the number of skyscrapers in Spain has significantly grown, out of the buildings in this list just 18 were completed before the year 2000 with all others being completed after that year.

For a list of the tallest architectural structures in Spain, which are not classified as buildings, like chimneys, towers and masts, see list of tallest structures in Spain.

Tallest completed buildings

This includes spires and architectural details but does not include antenna masts. An asterisk (*) indicates that the building is still under construction, but has been topped out.

Tallest under construction or proposed

Under construction

Proposed

Timeline of tallest buildings

See also 
 List of tallest buildings in Barcelona
 List of tallest buildings in Valencia
 List of tallest buildings in Madrid
 List of tallest buildings in Canary Islands
 List of tallest structures in Spain
 List of tallest buildings in Europe

References